Diadelia nervulata is a species of beetle in the family Cerambycidae. It was described by Fairmaire in 1903.

Subspecies
 Diadelia nervulata nervulata Fairmaire, 1903
 Diadelia nervulata propinqua Breuning, 1940

References

Diadelia
Beetles described in 1903